Verquières is a commune in the Bouches-du-Rhône department in southern France.

History
Towards the middle of the 12th century when the manor fell Diocese of Avignon on which city had been built. The parish was removed and attached to Saint-Andiol, and then restored in 1841.

Aside from his Mas Provençal, very typical include its castle and the Jesuit Church of St. Vérédème, fortified 14th century and enlarged in the 19th.

Its features: a massive square tower and spire serving his masons' marks, its barrel-vaulted nave broken, its apse semi-circular buttresses crowned with watch towers.

There are also beautiful wrought iron cross, very ornate they are due to the dexterity of the Reverend Roy who was pastor of the town from 1876 to 1894.

Population

See also
 Communes of the Bouches-du-Rhône department

References

Communes of Bouches-du-Rhône
Bouches-du-Rhône communes articles needing translation from French Wikipedia